The Palm Beach Currumbin Alleygators Rugby Union Football Club, alternatively shortened to PBC Alleygators, or PBCRUC, is an Australian rugby union football club that competes in the Gold Coast and District Rugby Union competition. The club is based in Palm Beach and Currumbin on  Queensland's Gold Coast. The club's name is a play on Currumbin Alley

History

See also

 Sports on the Gold Coast, Queensland
 Rugby union in Queensland
 List of Australian rugby union teams

References

External links

Rugby union teams in Queensland
Rugby clubs established in 1979
1979 establishments in Australia
Currumbin, Queensland
Rugby union teams on the Gold Coast, Queensland